Charles Richard Barton Speight (13 July 1870 – 23 December 1935) was a New Zealand rugby union player. A forward, who came out of the Parnell club, Speight represented Auckland at a provincial level. He was a member of the New Zealand national side in 1893, playing seven tour matches for the team.

After moving to Hamilton, Speight served as a member of the Hamilton Borough Council and the Waikato Trotting Club committee. He died in Hamilton on 23 December 1935 and was buried at Hamilton East Cemetery.

His brother, Harold Murray Hamilton Speight, also represented Auckland in 1894.

References

1870 births
1935 deaths
Rugby union players from Auckland
New Zealand rugby union players
New Zealand international rugby union players
Auckland rugby union players
Rugby union forwards
New Zealand sportsperson-politicians
Local politicians in New Zealand
New Zealand sports executives and administrators
Burials at Hamilton East Cemetery